The Keşla 2019–20 season was Keşla's second full season since the changed their name on 28 October 2017, and the nineteenth Azerbaijan Premier League season.

Season events
On 13 March 2020, the Azerbaijan Premier League was postponed due to the COVID-19 pandemic.

On 19 June 2020, the AFFA announced that the 2019–20 season had been officially ended without the resumption of the remains matches due to the escalating situation of the COVID-19 pandemic in Azerbaijan.

On 22 June, Vusal Isgandarli, Azer Salahli, Tarlan Guliyev and Ruslan Amirjanov all signed a new contracts with Keşla, until the end of the 2020–21 season.

On 25 June, John Kamara signed a new contract with Keşla for the 2020–21 season.

On 26 June, Rashad Azizli and Ilkin Qirtimov signed new one-year contracts with Keşla.

Squad

Transfers

In

Loans in

Released

Friendlies

Competitions

Azerbaijan Premier League

Results summary

Results by round

Results

League table

Azerbaijan Cup

Squad statistics

Appearances and goals

|-
|colspan="14"|Players away from Keşla on loan:
|-
|colspan="14"|Players who left Keşla during the season:
|}

Goal scorers

Clean sheets

Disciplinary record

References

External links 
 Inter Baku at Soccerway.com

Shamakhi FK seasons
Azerbaijani football clubs 2019–20 season